Clean-up is a part of the workflow in the production of hand-drawn animation.

In traditional animation, the first drawings are called "roughs" or "rough animation" because they are often done in a very loose fashion. If the animation is successfully pencil tested and approved by the director, clean versions of the drawings have to be done. In larger studios, this task is given to the animator's assistant, or, in a more specialised setting, to a clean-up-artist. The artist doing the clean-ups is responsible for the final line and finished look of the drawn character or object.

Clean-up animation is the process of creating the final drawings you see in the finished film. It does not necessarily mean a "clean" fine line. The artist, usually a team of artists, uses key drawings and animation charts from the animator, making it appear as though one artist has created the whole film. The clean-up artists will follow the intentions of the animators and stay true to performance and movement.

Clean-up is generally done on a new sheet of paper. They can be done on the same sheet as the rough animation if this was done with a "non-copy blue" pencil. This certain tone of blue will be invisible to photocopying machines, and can be filtered out by scanners. The finished animation will be copied on cels or transferred into a computer for further processing.

On average, clean-up usually takes twice as long as the rough animation because of the precision and extra drawings that are required to complete a shot.

Nowadays, clean-up animation can be done digitally via graphics tablet and software.

External links

Helpful Hints For CleanUp notes at AnimationMeat.com

Animation techniques
Animation people